Ptochoryctis inviolata is a moth in the family Autostichidae. It was described by Edward Meyrick in 1925. It is found in Mumbai, India.

The wingspan is about 20 mm. The forewings are glossy white with the costal edge blackish towards the base and with three or four minute blackish specks before the lower part of the termen. The hindwings are whitish.

References

Moths described in 1925
Ptochoryctis